Milton Byron Babbitt (May 10, 1916 – January 29, 2011) was an American composer, music theorist, mathematician, and teacher. He is particularly noted for his serial and electronic music.

Biography
Babbitt was born in Philadelphia to Albert E. Babbitt and Sarah Potamkin, who were Jewish. He was raised in Jackson, Mississippi, and began studying the violin when he was four but soon switched to clarinet and saxophone. Early in his life he was attracted to jazz and theater music, and "played in every pit-orchestra that came to town". Babbitt was making his own arrangements of popular songs by age 7, "wrote a lot of pop tunes for school productions", and won a local songwriting contest when he was 13. A Jackson newspaper called Babbitt a "whiz kid" and noted "that he had perfect pitch and could add up his family’s grocery bills in his head. In his teens he became a great fan of jazz cornet player Bix Beiderbecke."

Babbitt's father was a mathematician, and Babbitt intended to study mathematics when he entered the University of Pennsylvania in 1931. But he soon transferred to New York University, where he studied music with Philip James and Marion Bauer. There he became interested in the music of the composers of the Second Viennese School and wrote articles on twelve-tone music, including the first description of combinatoriality and a serial "time-point" technique. After receiving his Bachelor of Arts degree from New York University College of Arts & Science in 1935 with Phi Beta Kappa honors, he studied under Roger Sessions, first privately and then at Princeton University. He joined Princeton's music faculty in 1938 and received one of Princeton's first Master of Fine Arts degrees in 1942. During the Second World War, Babbitt divided his time between mathematical research in Washington, D.C., and Princeton, where he was a member of the mathematics faculty from 1943 to 1945.

In 1948, Babbitt returned to Princeton's music faculty and in 1973 he joined the faculty of the Juilliard School. Among his more notable students are music theorists David Lewin and John Rahn, composers Bruce Adolphe, Michael Dellaira, Kenneth Fuchs, Laura Karpman, Paul Lansky, Donald Martino, John Melby, Kenneth Lampl, Tobias Picker, and J. K. Randall, the theater composer Stephen Sondheim, composers and pianists Frederic Rzewski and Richard Aaker Trythall, and the jazz guitarist and composer Stanley Jordan.

In 1958, Babbitt achieved unsought notoriety through an article in the popular magazine High Fidelity. His title for the article was "The Composer as Specialist" (as it was later published several times) but, he said, "The editor, without my knowledge and—therefore—my consent or assent, replaced my title by the more 'provocative' one: 'Who Cares if You Listen?', a title which reflects little of the letter and nothing of the spirit of the article".

More than 30 years later, he said, "For all that the true source of that offensively vulgar title has been revealed many times, in many ways, even—eventually—by the offending journal itself, I still am far more likely to be known as the author of 'Who Cares if You Listen?' than as the composer of music to which you may or may not care to listen".

Around 1960, Babbitt became interested in electronic music. RCA hired him as consultant composer to work with its RCA Mark II Synthesizer at the Columbia-Princeton Electronic Music Center (known since 1996 as the Columbia University Computer Music Center). In 1961 he produced his Composition for Synthesizer, marking the beginning of a second period in his output. Babbitt was less interested in producing new timbres than in the rhythmic precision he could achieve with the synthesizer, a degree of precision previously unobtainable in performance.

Through the 1960s and 1970s Babbitt wrote both electronic music and music for conventional musical instruments, often combining the two. Philomel (1964), for example, is for soprano and a synthesized accompaniment (including the recorded and manipulated voice of Bethany Beardslee, for whom the piece was composed) stored on magnetic tape.

By the end of the 1970s Babbitt was beginning his third creative period by shifting his focus away from electronic music, the genre that first gained for him public notice. Like most dodecaphonic music, Babbitt's compositions are typically considered atonal, but it has also been shown that, especially in his third-period music, notes from his serial structures (all-partition arrays and superarrays) are sometimes arranged and coordinated to forge tonal chords, cadential phrases, simulated tonal voice-leading, and other tonal allusions, allowing for double meaning (serial and tonal), like many of his composition titles. This phenomenon of "double meaning" of notes (pitches) in the context of his double-meaning titles has been called portmantonality.

From 1985 until his death Babbitt served as the Chairman of the BMI Student Composer Awards, the international competition for young classical composers. A resident of Princeton, New Jersey, he died there on January 29, 2011, at age 94.

Filmmaker Robert Hilferty's Babbitt: Portrait of a Serial Composer broadly depicts Babbitt’s thinking, attitudes about his past and then-current work in footage largely from 1991-1992. The film was not completed and fully edited until 2010, and was presented on NPR online upon Babbitt’s death.

Honors and awards
 1965 – Member of the American Academy of Arts and Letters
 1974 – Fellow of the American Academy of Arts and Sciences
 1982 – Pulitzer Prize, Special Citation, "for his life's work as a distinguished and seminal American composer"
 1986 – MacArthur Fellow
 1988 – Mississippi Institute of Arts and Letters Award for music composition
 2000 – National Patron of Delta Omicron, an international, professional music fraternity
 2010 – The Max Reger Foundation of America – Extraordinary Life Time Musical Achievement Award

Articles
(1955). "Some Aspects of Twelve-Tone Composition". The Score and I.M.A. Magazine 12:53–61.
(1958). "Who Cares if You Listen?". High Fidelity (February). [Babbitt called this article "The Composer as Specialist". The original title was changed without his knowledge or permission by an editor at High Fidelity.]
(1960). "Twelve-Tone Invariants as Compositional Determinants," The Musical Quarterly 46/2.
(1961). "Set Structure as Compositional Determinant," Journal of Music Theory 5/1.
(1965). "The Structure and Function of Musical Theory," College Music Symposium 5.
(1972). "Contemporary Music Composition and Music Theory as Contemporary Intellectual History", Perspectives in Musicology: The Inaugural Lectures of the Ph. D. Program in Music at the City University of New York, edited by Barry S. Brook, Edward Downes, and Sherman Van Solkema, 270–307. New York: W. W. Norton. . Reprinted, New York: Pendragon Press, 1985. .
(1987) Words About Music: The Madison Lectures, edited by Stephen Dembski and Joseph Straus. Madison: University of Wisconsin Press.
(1992) "The Function of Set Structure in the Twelve-Tone System." PhD Dissertation. Princeton: Princeton University.
(2003). The Collected Essays of Milton Babbitt, edited by Stephen Peles, Stephen Dembski, Andrew Mead, Joseph Straus. Princeton: Princeton University Press.

List of compositions

First period

1935 Generatrix for orchestra (unfinished)
1939–41 String Trio
1940 Composition for String Orchestra (unfinished)
1941 Symphony (unfinished)
1941 Music for the Mass I for mixed chorus
1942 Music for the Mass II for mixed chorus
1946 Fabulous Voyage (musical, libretto by Richard Koch)
1946 Three Theatrical Songs for voice and piano (taken from Fabulous Voyage)
1947 Three Compositions for Piano
1948 Composition for Four Instruments
1948 String Quartet No. 1 (withdrawn)
1948 Composition for Twelve Instruments
1949 Into the Good Ground film music (withdrawn)
1950 Composition for Viola and Piano
1951 The Widow's Lament in Springtime for soprano and piano
1951 Du for soprano and piano, August Stramm
1953 Woodwind Quartet
1954 String Quartet No. 2
1954 Vision and Prayer for soprano and piano (unpublished, unperformed)
1955 Two Sonnets for baritone, clarinet, viola, and cello, two poems of Gerard Manley Hopkins
1956 Duet for piano
1956 Semi-Simple Variations for piano
1957 All Set for jazz ensemble (alto saxophone, tenor saxophone, trumpet, trombone, contrabass, piano, vibraphone, and percussion)
1957 Partitions for piano
1960 Composition for Tenor and Six Instruments
1960 Sounds and Words for soprano and piano

Second period

1961 Composition for Synthesizer
1961 Vision and Prayer for soprano and synthesized tape, setting of a poem by Dylan Thomas
1964 Philomel for soprano, recorded soprano, synthesized tape, setting of a poem by John Hollander
1964 Ensembles for Synthesizer
1965 Relata I for orchestra
1966 Post-Partitions for piano
1966 Sextets for violin and piano
1966 Play on Notes for bells and voice
1967 Correspondences for string orchestra and synthesized tape
1968 Relata II for orchestra
1968–69 Four Canons for SA
1969 Phonemena for soprano and piano
1970 String Quartet No. 3
1970 String Quartet No. 4
1968–71 Occasional Variations for synthesized tape
1972 Tableaux for piano
1974 Arie da capo for five instrumentalists
1975 Reflections for piano and synthesized tape
1975 Phonemena for soprano and synthesized tape
1976 Concerti for violin, small orchestra, synthesized tape
1976 A Birthday Double Canon for SATB
1977 A Solo Requiem for soprano and two pianos
1977 Minute Waltz (or 3/4 ± 1/8) for piano
1977 Playing for Time for piano
1978 My Ends Are My Beginnings for solo clarinet
1978 My Complements to Roger for piano
1978 More Phonemena for twelve-part chorus
1978 Eppesithalamium for solo cello
1979 An Elizabethan Sextette for six-part women's chorus
1979 Images for saxophonist and synthesized tape

Third period

1979 Paraphrases for ten instrumentalists
1980 Dual for cello and piano
1981 Ars Combinatoria for small orchestra
1981 Don for four-hand piano
1982 The Head of the Bed for soprano and four instruments
1982 String Quartet No. 5
1982 Melismata for solo violin
1982 About Time for piano
1983 Canonical Form for piano
1983 Groupwise for flautist and four instruments
1984 Four Play for four players
1984 It Takes Twelve to Tango for piano
1984 Sheer Pluck (composition for guitar)
1985 Concerto for piano and orchestra
1985 Lagniappe for piano
1986 Transfigured Notes for string orchestra
1986 The Joy of More Sextets for piano and violin
1987 Three Cultivated Choruses for four-part chorus
1987 Fanfare for double brass sextet
1987 Overtime for piano
1987 Souper for speaker and ensemble
1987 Homily for snare drum
1987 Whirled Series for saxophone and piano
1988 In His Own Words for speaker and piano
1988 The Virginal Book for contralto and piano, setting of a poem by John Hollander
1988 Beaten Paths for solo marimba
1988 Glosses for Boys' Choir
1988 The Crowded Air for eleven instruments
1989 Consortini for five players
1989 Play It Again, Sam for solo viola
1989 Emblems (Ars Emblematica), for piano
1989 Soli e duettini for two guitars
1989 Soli e duettini for flute and guitar
1990 Soli e duettini for violin and viola
1990 Envoi for four hands, piano
1991 Preludes, Interludes, and Postlude for piano
1991 Four Cavalier Settings for tenor and guitar
1991 Mehr "Du" for soprano, viola and piano
1991 None but the Lonely Flute for solo flute
1992 Septet, But Equal
1992 Counterparts for brass quintet
1993 Around the Horn for solo horn
1993 Quatrains for soprano and two clarinets
1993 Fanfare for All for brass quintet
1993 String Quartet No. 6
1994 Triad for viola, clarinet, and piano
1994 No Longer Very Clear for soprano and four instruments, setting of a poem by John Ashbery
1994 Tutte le corde for piano
1994 Arrivals and Departures for two violins
1994 Accompanied Recitative for soprano sax and piano
1995 Manifold Music for organ
1995 Bicenquinquagenary Fanfare for brass quintet
1995 Quartet for piano and string trio
1996 Quintet for clarinet and string quartet
1996 Danci for solo guitar
1996 When Shall We Three Meet Again? for flute, clarinet and vibraphone
1998 Piano Concerto No. 2
1998 The Old Order Changeth for piano
1999 Composition for One Instrument for celesta
1999 Allegro Penseroso for piano
1999 Concerto Piccolino for vibraphone
2000 Little Goes a Long Way for violin and piano
2000 Pantuns for soprano and piano
2001 A Lifetime or So for tenor and piano
2002 From the Psalter soprano and string orchestra
2002 Now Evening after Evening for soprano and piano, setting of a poem by Derek Walcott
2002 A Gloss on 'Round Midnight for piano
2003 Swan Song No. 1 for flute, oboe, violin, cello, mandolin (or guitar), and guitar
2003 A Waltzer in the House for soprano and vibraphone, setting of a poem by Stanley Kunitz
2004 Round for SATB
2004 Concerti for Orchestra, for James Levine and the Boston Symphony Orchestra
2004 Autobiography of the Eye for soprano and cello, setting of a poem by Paul Auster
2005–6 More Melismata for solo cello
2006 An Encore for violin & piano

String quartets

First period
1948 String Quartet No. 1 (withdrawn)
1954 String Quartet No. 2

Second period
1970 String Quartet No. 3
1970 String Quartet No. 4

Third period
1982 String Quartet No. 5
1993 String Quartet No. 6

Selected discography
Clarinet Quintets. Phoenix Ensemble (Mark Lieb, clarinet; Aaron Boyd, Kristi Helberg, and Alicia Edelberg, violins; Cyrus Beroukhim, viola; Alberto Parinni and Bruce Wang, cellos). (Morton Feldman, Clarinet and String Quartet; Milton Babbitt, Quintet for Clarinet and String Quartet). Innova 746. St. Paul, Minnesota: American Composers Forum, 2009.
 Concerto for Piano And Orchestra/The Head Of The Bed. Alan Feinberg, piano; American Composers Orchestra, Charles Wuorinen, conductor; Judith Bettina, soprano, Parnassus, Anthony Korf. New World Records 80346.
 The Juilliard Orchestra. Vincent Persichetti: Night Dances (cond. James DePreist); Milton Babbitt: Relata I (cond. Paul Zukofsky); David Diamond: Symphony No. 5 (cond. Christopher Keene). New World Records 80396–2. New York: Recorded Anthology od Music, 1990.
 The Juilliard String Quartet: Sessions, Wolpe, Babbitt. Roger Sessions, String Quartet No. 2 (1951); Stefan Wolpe, String Quartet (1969); Milton Babbitt, String Quartet No. 4 (1970). The Juilliard Quartet (Robert Mann, Joel Smirnoff, violins; Samuel Rhodes, viola; Joel Krosnick, cello). CRI CD 587. New York: Composers Recordings, Inc., 1990.
 Occasional Variations (String Quartets no. 2 and No. 6, Occasional Variations, Composition for Guitar). William Anderson, guitar; Fred Sherry Quartet, Composers String Quartet. Tzadik 7088. New York: Tzadik, 2003.
 Philomel (Philomel, Phonemena for soprano and piano, Phonemena for soprano and tape, Post-Partitions, Reflections). Bethany Beardslee and Lynne Webber, sopranos; Jerry Kuderna and Robert Miller, pianos. New World Records 80466-2 / DIDX 022920. New York: Recorded Anthology of American Music, 1995. The material on this CD was issued on New World LPs NW 209 and NW 307, in 1977 and 1980, respectively.
 Quartet No. 3 for Strings. (With Charles Wuorinen, Quartet for Strings.) The Fine Arts Quartet. Turnabout TV-S 34515.
 Sextets; The Joy of More Sextets. Rolf Schulte, violin; Alan Feinberg, piano. New World Records NW 364–2. New York: Recorded Anthology of American Music, 1988.
 Soli e Duettini (Around the Horn, Whirled Series, None but the Lonely Flute, Homily, Beaten Paths, Play it Again Sam, Soli e Duettini, Melismata). The Group for Contemporary Music. Naxos 8559259.
Three American String Quartets. Mel Powell, String Quartet (1982); Elliott Carter, Quartet for Strings No. 4 (1986); Milton Babbitt, Quartet No. 5 (1982). Composers Quartet (Matthew Raimondi, Anahid Ajemian, violins; Maureen Gallagher, Karl Bargen, violas; Mark Shuman, cello). Music & Arts CD-606. Berkeley: Music and Arts Program of America, Inc., 1990.
 An Elizabethan Sextette (An Elizabethan Sextette, Minute Waltz, Partitions, It Takes Twelve to Tango, Playing for Time, About Time, Groupwise, Vision And Prayer). Alan Feinberg, piano; Bethany Beardslee, soprano; The Group for Contemporary Music, Harvey Sollberger, conducting. CRI CD 521. New York: Composers Recordings, Inc., 1988. Reissued on CRI/New World NWCR521.

References

Sources
 
 
 
 
 
 
 
 
 
 
 

 
 
 
 (January 29). Retrieved January 30, 2011.

Further reading
 Crawford, Richard, and Larry Hamberlin (2013). An Introduction to America's Music, second edition. New York: W. W. Norton & Company. . 
 Fisk, Josiah, and Jeff Nichols (1997). Composers on Music: Eight Centuries of Writings, second edition. Boston: Northeastern University Press.  (cloth);  (pbk). 
 Mead, Andrew (1994). An Introduction to the Music of Milton Babbitt. Princeton, New Jersey: Princeton University Press. . 
 Westergaard, Peter (1965). "Some Problems Raised by the Rhythmic Procedures in Milton Babbitt's Composition for Twelve Instruments". Perspectives of New Music 4, no. 1 (Autumn–Winter): 109–18.

External links

Avant Garde Project AGP72: Piano music of Milton Babbitt as played by Robert Taub
Schirmer.com: Milton Babbitt

Furious.com Milton Babbitt talks about Philomel
Two Discussions With Milton Babbitt. Interviewed by James Romig at the Dickinson College Arts Awards on April 11, 2002.
An interview with Milton Babbitt. Interviewed by Gabrielle Zuckerman, American Public Media, July 2002
Interview with Milton Babbitt, November 6, 1987
Milton Babbitt Collection, 1970-2005 at the Library of Congress

Listening
Babbitt's Beguiling Surfaces, Improvised Inside, Three-part video essay from the Society for Music Theory by Joshua Banks Mailman, 2019.
Slowly Expanding Milton Babbitt Album (since 2018), produced by Erik Carlson
Milton Babbitt interview from National Public Radio Performance Today program, May 10, 2006
Speaking of Music: Milton Babbitt Interviewed by Charles Amirkhanian, 1984
Art of the States: Milton Babbitt
Recording Concerto Piccolino – Lee Ferguson, vibraphone Luna Nova New Music Ensemble
Recording None But the Lonely Flute – John McMurtery, flute Luna Nova New Music Ensemble
Woodwind Quartet (1953), performed by members of the Soni Ventorum Wind Quintet.
Robert Hilferty documentary on Milton Babbitt
 Milton Babbitt "The Revolution in Musical Thought" The Baltimore Museum of Art: Baltimore, Maryland, 1963 Accessed June 26, 2012
 Soni Ventorum plays the Woodwind Quartet

Bibliography
 

1916 births
2011 deaths
20th-century American composers
20th-century American male musicians
20th-century classical composers
21st-century American composers
21st-century American male musicians
21st-century classical composers
American electronic musicians
American classical composers
American male classical composers
American music theorists
Fellows of the American Academy of Arts and Sciences
Honorary Members of the Royal Academy of Music
Jewish American classical composers
Juilliard School faculty
MacArthur Fellows
Members of the American Academy of Arts and Letters
Music & Arts artists
Musicians from Jackson, Mississippi
Musicians from Philadelphia
New York University alumni
Nonesuch Records artists
People from Princeton, New Jersey
Princeton University faculty
Pulitzer Prize winners
Pupils of Roger Sessions
Pupils of Marion Bauer
Twelve-tone and serial composers
Tzadik Records artists
21st-century American Jews